Without Your Love is the first solo studio album by American witch house recording artist and producer oOoOO. It was released June 24, 2013, by Nihjgt Feelings.

Without Your Love is following two previous successful EP efforts by oOoOO, oOoOO EP and Our Loving is Hurting Us. Mouchette was inspired by the French art house film of the same title by Robert Bresson.

As a special guest, Butterclock (also known as Laura Clock) sings in Stay Here and in the homonymous fourth track. She is a witch house musician and her participation has been quite notorious since oOoOO's beginnings.

Track listing

References

2013 debut albums
OOoOO albums